Ellen Franz (30 May 1839 – 24 March 1923) was a German pianist and actress.

Biography

Early life
She was born in Berlin. According to Friedrich Martin von Bodenstedt, Ellen Franz made her first appearance in the Hoftheater of Meiningen in 1867.

Marriage
On 18 March 1873 she married, as his third wife, Georg II, Duke of Saxe-Meiningen, in the Villa Feodora in Bad Liebenstein. Because of her bourgeois origin, the Duke ennobled her shortly before their marriage, as Baroness von Heldburg, the title by which she was henceforth known. This morganatic marriage annoyed the German Emperor Wilhelm II so much that because of his aversion towards Helene he decided not to visit the Schloss Altenstein after the reconstruction undertaken by Georg II and completed in 1889.

Development of Meiningen Theatre

The Duke and she, together with the Director Ludwig Chronegk, established the "Meiningen Principles" (Meininger Prinzipien), a profound reform in theatrical practice, and created what would become the world-famous Meiningen Ensemble (Meininger Hoftheater). Helene also implemented major changes in the dramaturgy, as well as being  responsible for commitment and cast decisions and the education of young students. Her husband Georg II together with Chronegk undertook the direction, and decided on the appropriate scenery and costumes.

After the death of her husband in 1914, Helene retired to her country seat, the Veste Heldburg. From 1918 she lived in the palace "Helenenstift", her widow's residence built in 1891/92. She died in the year 1923, aged eighty-three, in Meiningen. She was buried near the Duke Georg II in a common grave arrangement in the Meininger Park Churchyard (Meininger Parkfriedhof).

Bibliography
 Ludwig Eisenberg: Großes biographisches Lexikon der Deutschen Bühne im XIX. Jahrhundert. edited by Paul List, Leipzig 1903, . online
 Eva Hoffmann-Aleith: Ellen Franz, Evangelische Verlagsanstalt Berlin, 1989, 
 
 Kuratorium Meiningen (ed): Lexikon zur Stadtgeschichte Meiningen. Bielsteinverlag, Meiningen 2008, .
 Norbert Klaus Fuchs: Das Heldburger Land–ein historischer Reiseführer; ed. Rockstuhl, Bad Langensalza 2013,

External links

 
 

1839 births
1923 deaths
House of Saxe-Meiningen
Morganatic spouses of German royalty
Actresses from Berlin
19th-century German actresses
German stage actresses